TIMM (stylized as TiMM.) was a German language free-to-air cable and satellite service from Germany targeting gay male audiences. It was first launched on November 1, 2008. It was also available over a live stream.

TIMM is a general lifestyle and entertainment channel with an array of programming including dramas, comedies, films, lifestyle series and more.  As of February 1, 2009 it airs 24/7. In January 2010, the Deutsche Fernsehwerke GmbH, owner of TIMM, applied for insolvency proceedings. TIMM stopped airing via Astra 1L as of 22 February 2010, and was available via cable only.

References

External links
TimmTV.com  (former site timm.de now redirects to Burkhard-Timm.com)
DFW website 
TIMM at LyngSat Address

2008 establishments in Germany
Gay male television channels
LGBT-related mass media in Germany
Television channels and stations established in 2008
Television stations in Berlin